Wistanstow Halt railway station was a station in Wistanstow, Shropshire, England. The station was opened in 1934 and closed in 1956.

References

Further reading

Disused railway stations in Shropshire
Railway stations in Great Britain opened in 1934
Railway stations in Great Britain closed in 1956
Former Shrewsbury and Hereford Railway stations